The 2019 BWF World Tour (officially known as the 2019 HSBC BWF World Tour for sponsorship reasons) was the second season of the BWF World Tour of badminton, a circuit of 26 tournaments which led up to the World Tour Finals tournament. The 27 tournaments were divided into five levels: Level 1 was the said World Tour Finals, Level 2 called Super 1000 (three tournaments), Level 3 called Super 750 (five tournaments), Level 4 called Super 500 (seven tournaments) and Level 5 called Super 300 (11 tournaments). Each of these tournaments offered different ranking points and prize money. The highest points and prize pool were offered at the Super 1000 level (including the World Tour Finals). 

One other category of tournament, the BWF Tour Super 100 (level 6), also offered BWF World Tour ranking points. BWF Tour Super 100 was an important part of the pathway and entry point for players into the BWF World Tour tournaments. When the 10 Level 6 grade tournaments of the BWF Tour Super 100 were included, the complete tour consisted of 37 tournaments.

Results
Below is the schedule released by the Badminton World Federation:

Key

Winners

Finals

January

February

March

April

May 
No World Tour tournaments were held in May.

June

July

August

September

October

November

December

Statistics

Performance by countries
Below are the 2019 BWF World Tour performances by countries. Only countries who have won a title are listed:

 BWF World Tour

 BWF Tour Super 100

Performance by categories 

Accurate as of the MD final (5/5 matches) of the BWF World Tour Finals.

Men's singles

Women's singles

Men's doubles

Women's doubles

Mixed doubles

World Tour Finals rankings 
The points are calculated from the following levels:
BWF World Tour Super 1000,
BWF World Tour Super 750, 
BWF World Tour Super 500, 
BWF World Tour Super 300 (except Syed Modi International), 
BWF Tour Super 100.

This table were calculated after Korea Masters.

Men's singles

Women's singles

Men's doubles

Women's doubles

Mixed doubles

References

 
World Tour
BWF World Tour